Clare Foster (born 24 July 1980) is a British actress, known for portraying the role of PC Millie Brown in the ITV series The Bill. Foster appeared in the 2011 London revival production of Crazy for You, which played at the Novello Theatre, in the 2016-2017 revival production of Tom Stoppard's Travesties first at the Menier Chocolate Factory and later at the Apollo Theatre and in the 2018 West End revival of Consent.

In 2022 Foster starred in BBC Radio 4's musical adaptation of Rossum's Universal Robots.

Theatre

Stage career

Filmography

References

External links
 
 Clare Foster at Broadway World
 Crazy for You Official Site

Living people
British actresses
1981 births